Wells' Regiment of Militia also known as the 5th Hampshire County Militia Regiment was called up at Shelburne, Massachusetts on September 22, 1777, as reinforcements for the Continental Army during the Saratoga Campaign. The regiment marched quickly to join the gathering forces of General Horatio Gates as he faced British General John Burgoyne in northern New York. The regiment served in General Fellow's brigade. With the surrender of Burgoyne's Army on October 17, 1777, the regiment was disbanded the next day (October 18, 1777).

References

Massachusetts militia
Military units and formations established in 1777
Military units and formations disestablished in 1777
1777 establishments in Massachusetts
1777 disestablishments in the United States